When the Spaniards Were Here (Da Spanierne var her) is a romantic, comic play by Hans Christian Andersen. It premiered on the Royal Danish Theatre in Copenhagen on 6 April 1865, just a few days after the celebration of Andersen's 60th birthday.

Composition
Andersen's first childhood memory involved Spanish soldiers on Funen. The first time they appear in his writings is in the poem Soldaten (The Soldier) from 1830. The male protagonist of his play Skilles og mødes was also a Spanish soldier. In 1835. Amdersem wrote a vaudeville totæed Spanierne i Odense (The Spaniards in Odense) which never premiered. In 1865, he adapted it into the play When the Spaniards Were Here, changing the setting from Odense to Middelfart.

Production history
The play premiered at the Royal Danish Theatre on 6 April 1976.  The theatre was sold-out and members of the royal family were present at the event. It played seven times. The cast included;
 Fritz Hultmann as Carl Bryske
 Louise Sahlgreen as Madam 
 Agnes Lange as Herminia
 Louise Phister as etatsrådinde Prip

Image gallery

References

Hans Christian Andersen
19th-century Danish plays
1865 plays